The Goldfinger is an upcoming Hong Kong action crime thriller film written and directed by Felix Chong, and starring Tony Leung and Andy Lau. Set in the 1980s, the film is based on the story of Carrian Group, a Hong Kong corporation which rose rapidly before collapsing shortly afterwards due to a corruption scandal.

Budgeted at HK$350 million, production for the film began in February 2021 and wrapped up on 24 May 2021.

Plot
When a stock market crash causes the sudden collapse of a multi-billion-dollar company, an ICAC investigator (Andy Lau) uncovers a criminal conspiracy involving the company’s founder, Ching Yat-yin (Tony Leung) and becomes entangled in a long-running investigation.

Cast
Tony Leung Chiu-wai as Ching Yat-yin, founder of a multi-billion-dollar company who is based on Carrian Group founder George Tan.
Andy Lau as an investigator of the Independent Commission Against Corruption (ICAC).
Simon Yam
Charlene Choi
Alex Fong
Philip Keung
Chin Ka-lok
Carlos Chan
Catherine Chau

Production
Production for The Goldfinger began in February 2021. On 20 February 2021, the film held its production commencement press conference at Emperor Cinema located in iSquare in Tsim Sha Tsui where it was attended by Emperor Motion Pictures chairman Albert Yeung, producer Ronald Wong, screenwriter and director Felix Chong, alongside cast members Andy Lau, Tony Leung, Simon Yam, Charlene Choi, Alex Fong, Philip Keung, Chin Ka-lok (who also serves as the film's action director), Carlos Chan and Catherine Chau. According to Yeung, the film is produced at a budget of HK$350 million, a recording-breaking budget for a Hong Kong production, and anticipates the film to break box office records as the highest-grossing Hong Kong film. At the event, Lau revealed he first received from the script producer Wong and after reading it, he believed Leung is the best choice to act as his on-screen opponent. On the other hand, Leung revealed that his and Lau's roles in the film are reversed from their previous collaboration in the Infernal Affairs film series.

Production for The Goldfinger officially wrapped up on 24 May 2021, after filming its climax scene involving Lau and Leung on location in a presidential suite at The Peninsula.

See also
Andy Lau filmography

References

Upcoming films
Hong Kong action thriller films
Hong Kong crime thriller films
Cantonese-language films
Emperor Motion Pictures films
Films directed by Felix Chong
Films about corruption
Films based on actual events
Films set in the 1980s
Films set in Hong Kong
Films shot in Hong Kong
Independent Commission Against Corruption (Hong Kong)